Konrad Warzycha (born February 14, 1989) is a Polish footballer who is currently without a club.

Career

College and amateur
Warzycha was born in Poland, and later lived in England and Hungary, before moving with his family to the United States in 1997. He grew up in Dublin, Ohio, attended Jerome High School, and played for the Ohio Blast club team, before going on to play college soccer at Ohio State University. As a junior in 2009 Warzycha earned a spot on the All-Big Ten Second Team, while as a senior he started all 18 of his Buckeyes' games, scoring eight goals in his final year with the team, and was named to the All-Big Ten First Team.

Professional
On January 13, 2011, Warzycha was drafted in the third round by Sporting Kansas City in the 2011 MLS SuperDraft. He signed with the club on March 3, 2011. On May 29, 2012, Warzycha made his debut for the club in a 3-2 win over Orlando City in the Lamar Hunt U.S. Open Cup. On August 28, 2012 Warzycha was loaned to Carolina RailHawks for the remainder of the NASL season. On September 12, 2012 Warzycha was recalled by Sporting Kansas City from his loan. Warzycha was released by Kansas City on November 19, 2012.

Warzycha signed with the Columbus Crew on February 27, 2013. On April 27, 2013 he came on, late in the game as a substitution and become the second father-son, coach-player tandem in MLS history. After his father was dismissed in September, Konrad Warzycha's option was not picked up following the season.

Personal
Warzycha is the son of former Polish international Robert Warzycha, formerly the head coach of Columbus Crew.

References

External links
 
 Ohio State bio

1989 births
Living people
Polish footballers
Polish expatriate footballers
Ohio State Buckeyes men's soccer players
Sporting Kansas City players
North Carolina FC players
Columbus Crew players
Expatriate soccer players in the United States
Major League Soccer players
North American Soccer League players
People from Dublin, Ohio
Sporting Kansas City draft picks
Sportspeople from Zabrze
Association football midfielders
Soccer players from Ohio